Bernice Carr Vukovich (née Car) (born 12 January 1938) is a retired South African tennis player from South Africa of Croatian origin. Her father was a Croat immigrant from the peninsula of Pelješac.

Bernice completed her secondary education at End Street Convent (Holy Family order), matriculating in 1955. She was South African junior tennis champion in 1954 and 1955. After she began to compete in senior tennis, she won 1958 and 1960 South African championship, while in 1959 she was runner-up. In 1958, she beat Heather Brewer-Segal with 3–6, 7–5, 6–4. In 1959, she lost the title in a match against Sandra Reynolds, losing 6–0, 8–6. In 1960, she regained the title, beating Sandra Reynolds with 6–1, 2–6, 12–10.

In 1965 Bernice Vukovich beat Luisa Bassi (Italy) 7–5,6–0 to win the International lawn tennis tournament in Palermo, Sicily.

She played many international matches. She competed in 1965 Federation Cup quarterfinals, playing for South Africa against Great Britain. She lost both matches. In singles, she lost to Christine Janes, and in doubles, she played with Annette Du Plooy and lost against Ann Haydon Jones and Deidre Keller.

In the 1960 US Open, she defeated Billie Jean King in the third round. Carr Vukovich was seeded seventh in this tournament.

ITF finals

Singles (17–8)

Doubles (5–15)

References

External links
 
 

1938 births
South African female tennis players
South African people of Croatian descent
Living people